NET (an initialism of News and Entertainment Television, stylized as NET.) is an Indonesian free-to-air television network that was launched on 26 May 2013. It replaced  Spacetoon on terrestrial television. The channel's programming is focused towards family and young viewers.

History 
In 2012, PT Net Mediatama Indonesia was established. In March 2013 the company acquired PT Televisi Anak Spacetoon (Spacetoon) by purchasing 95% of its shares before the company was wholly acquired in May 2013. On 18 May 2013, NET started its trial broadcast using Spacetoon's frequencies on terrestrial television, limiting the latter broadcast to pay television.

Programming previously aired by Spacetoon was broadcast on a programming block called "NET Playground" or "NETTOON" that aired Mondays to Fridays afternoon until the block ceased to air a year later, and returned in 15 December 2018 to broadcast Cartoon Network shows, previously carried by Trans TV from 2016 to 2018.

On 3 April 2015, NET officially became the main sponsor of the football club Persija Jakarta for two years, during the 2015 Indonesia Super League. The following day, the network was announced as major sponsor of Persija's rival Persib Bandung, also for two years.

NET. received a Suspension on Debt Payment Obligation (PKPU) claim from 25 November 2020 by Bambang Sutrisno. Bambang withdrew the PKPU on 4 December 2020 after NET. paid the Rp2.5 billion debt. Another PKPU claim, this one from PT Seribu Layar Sinema, was withdrawn in January 2021 after NET. paid the Rp13.7 billion debt.

Presenters

Current
 Adam Suryanagara (Fakta +62)
 Anton Pradhana (Fakta +62)
 Devina Bertha (Jatanras)
 Indah Setyani (Fakta +62)
 Maria Anatasya (Fakta +62)
 Rahma Hayuningdyah (Fakta +62)
 Vannico Soekarno (former Trans TV anchor) (Jejak Peristiwa)

Former
 Adit Dipo
 Alice Callista
 Amanda Hajj (now at Kompas TV)
 Angie Ang (now at Trans7)
 Anggi Pasaribu (now at iNews and MNC News)
 Anjana Demira
 Annisa Pagih (now at CNN Indonesia, Trans7 and Trans TV)
 Ari Sanjaya
 Aris Satya (now at SEA Today)
 Astrid Satwika
 Azizah Hanum (now at SCTV)
 Ben Kasyafani
 Caroline Soerachmat (now at SEA Today)
 Chelzea Verhoeven
 Dea Githa
 Dilla Hantika
 Esther Cramer
 Farhana Khalid
 Farid Zaidt
 Febi Purnamasari
 Frianti Ishana
 Imelda Fransisca
 Isabella Fawzi
 Jacklyn Choppers
 Marissa Anita (now at SEA Today)
 Masyitha Baziad
 Mayfree Syari (now at CNN Indonesia, Trans7 and Trans TV)
 Nadia Soekarno 
 Natasya Helviana
 Nia Nurhasanah
 Panji Suryono (now at Moji)
 Peter Ngantung
 Rahma Hayuningdyah
 Rahma Landy (now at SEA Today)
 Ranggani Puspandya
 Sakti Al-Fattah
 Shahnaz Soehartono (now at Trans TV and SEA Today)
 Shara Virrisya
 Sheila Purnama (now at Indosiar and Ajwa TV)
 Shinta Zahara (now at CNBC Indonesia)
 Syarifah Rahma (now at CNBC Indonesia)
 Taufik Effendi
 Teuku Aditya
 Tita Hayati
 Tommy Fadjar
 Tomy Ristanto (now at Polri TV)
 Twinda Rarasati
 Wulan Juliani
 Zacky Hussein (now at RTV)
 Zendhy Zaen
 Zivanna Letisha Siregar (now at MetroTV)
 Zweta Manggarani

Slogans 
 Televisi Masa Kini (18 May 2013–31 December 2021)
 Nonton TV Asiknya di NET. (12 July 2019–31 December 2021)
 NET. Asiknya 24 Jam (22 March–31 May 2020)
 Kini Makin Asik (1 January 2022–present)

See also
 List of television stations in Indonesia
 Television in Indonesia

References

External links
 NET. Official Website

Television networks in Indonesia
Television channels and stations established in 2013
Mass media in Jakarta